Firefly is an album by American flautist Jeremy Steig recorded in 1977 and released on the CTI label.

Reception
The Allmusic review stated "Jeremy Steig's jazz-funk throwdown, Firefly, is one of the great forgotten masterpieces of the genre... Firefly was designed for the purpose of being a hit in the dance clubs, and it should have been, because it kicks ass on that level as well as on the jazz-funk beam... This is burning".

Track listing
 "Firefly" (Googie Coppola, David Matthews) - 11:55 
 "Living Inside Your Love" (Dave Grusin, Earl Klugh) - 5:48 
 "Everything Is Coming to the Light" (Coppola) - 2:59 
 "Hop Scotch" (Joe Chambers) - 7:26 
 "Sweet Hour of Prayer" (Traditional) - 2:04 
 "Grasshopper" (Jeremy Steig) - 5:17 
Recorded at Electric Lady Studios in New York City on March 4 (tracks 1, 2 & 6), March 22 (track 3) and April 11 (tracks 4 & 5), 1977

Personnel
Jeremy Steig - flute
Burt Collins, Jon Faddis, Joe Shepley, Lew Soloff - trumpet
Sam Burtis, Jerry Chamberlain, Tom Malone - trombone
Dave Taylor - bass trombone
Richard Tee - keyboards
Richie Beirach - piano
Clifford Carter - synthesizer
Hiram Bullock, Eric Gale, John Scofield - electric guitar
Gary King - bass
Steve Gadd, Allan Schwartzberg - drums 
Ray Mantilla - congas
Googie Coppolla - vocals
Sue Evans - percussion
David Matthews - electric piano, arranger

References

CTI Records albums
Jeremy Steig albums
1977 albums
Albums produced by Creed Taylor
Albums arranged by David Matthews (keyboardist)
Albums recorded at Electric Lady Studios